Erivaldo Antonio Saraiva (born November 22, 1980), commonly known as Erivaldo Saraiva or sometimes Valdo, is a Brazilian football (soccer) striker .

Club career

Early career in Brazil
During his early career, Valdo played for São Vicente and then Palmeiras when they were in the Second Division. Unable to hold down a regular place within the team despite seeing them go back up in the First Division he was allowed to leave the club and would become a journeyman for several other lower league Brazilian teams, which included Juventus AC, Rio Branco EC, Jataiense, EC Pelotas, Nova Iguaçu, Moto Club, Atlético Sorocaba and Luziânia.

CS Hammam-Lif
In 2007, he moved from Brazil for a transfer to a Tunisian club CS Hammam-Lif where he played in the First Division. His time with the club wasn't an inspired spell, however, the skill he tactical awareness he did show brought him to the attention of Chinese club Hangzhou Greentown F.C.

Hangzhou Greentown
Valdo moved to Hangzhou Greentown F.C. during the 2008 league season and where he immediately made an impact, he was their top goal scorer having racked up 10 goals in 7 league games. However, even with Valdo's impressive goal-scoring ability, the club was relegated from the Chinese Super League. 
On 26 July 2009, he scored a goal for Hangzhou in a 2-8 friendly defeat against Manchester United during United's tour of Asia.

Beijing Guoan
At the beginning of the 2010 league season he joined the league defending champions Beijing Guoan. He scored his first goal for the club on 28 April, in a 2–0 home win against Kawasaki Frontale on the 6th round of 2010 AFC Champions League group stage. Valdo was released by Beijing in June 2010.

Shonan Bellmare
Valdo was signed by Shonan Bellmare on 16 July 2010. He was released in the end of the season.

Liaoning Whowin
Valdo returned to China and signed a contract with Liaoning Whowin in Match 2011.

References

External links

Player stats at Sohu.com 

1980 births
Living people
Brazilian footballers
Brazilian expatriate footballers
Clube Atlético Juventus players
Rio Branco Esporte Clube players
Moto Club de São Luís players
Zhejiang Professional F.C. players
Beijing Guoan F.C. players
Liaoning F.C. players
CS Hammam-Lif players
Chinese Super League players
China League One players
J1 League players
Shonan Bellmare players
Chengdu Tiancheng F.C. players
Expatriate footballers in Tunisia
Expatriate footballers in China
Brazilian expatriate sportspeople in China
Expatriate footballers in Japan
Brazilian expatriate sportspeople in Japan
Association football forwards
Footballers from São Paulo (state)
People from Cubatão